A list of films produced in Spain in 1952 (see 1952 in film).

1952

External links
 Spanish films of 1952 at the Internet Movie Database

1952
Spanish
Films